Georg Gänswein (born 30 July 1956) is a German prelate of the Catholic Church, who serves as Prefect of the Papal Household, and was personal secretary to Pope Benedict XVI. He was a professor of canon law at the Pontifical University of the Holy Cross for about a decade and has been Titular Archbishop of Urbs Salvia since 2012.

Gänswein, who was born in Baden-Württemberg, Germany, is fluent in both speaking and writing Italian, Spanish, German, English, French, and Latin. Some foreign language publications use Gaenswein instead of the German spelling of his name.

Early years
Gänswein was born in Riedern am Wald, Waldshut, Baden-Württemberg, a village in the Black Forest and part of Ühlingen-Birkendorf municipality in Germany, as the eldest son of Albert Gänswein, a blacksmith, and his wife Gertrud. He has two brothers and two sisters.

Gänswein has said that he decided to become a priest in 1974 when he was 18. He began his seminary training in 1976 and was ordained a priest of the Archdiocese of Freiburg on 31 May 1984. He spent the next two years in the Black Forest as a curate (assistant priest). 

He received his J.C.D. degree from Ludwig Maximilian University of Munich in 1993, writing his dissertation about Ecclesiology according to the Second Vatican Council. He later said: "After half a year I was so fed up I said to myself, now I'm going to the archbishop and ask him to take me back into the diocese because I can't stand it anymore.... I'd always studied gladly and easily, but studying Canon Law I felt to be as dry as work in a quarry where there's no beer — you die of dryness."

Roman Curia
Gänswein moved to Rome in 1993. He entered the Roman Curia as an official of the Congregation for Divine Worship and the Discipline of the Sacraments in 1995 and joined the staff of Cardinal Joseph Ratzinger at the Congregation for the Doctrine of the Faith in 1996. He became a professor of canon law at the Pontifical University of the Holy Cross and taught there until 2005.

In 2000, Pope John Paul II gave him the title Chaplain of His Holiness. He replaced Josef Clemens as Ratzinger's personal secretary in 2003, when Clemens became secretary of the Pontifical Council for the Laity. When Ratzinger was elected pope in 2005, Gänswein was appointed Principal Private Secretary to His Holiness. A year later Pope Benedict XVI gave him the title Prelate of His Holiness.

In an interview in July 2006, he described the Pope's typical day: "The Pope's day begins with Mass at 7am, followed by morning prayer and a period of contemplation. Afterwards we eat breakfast together, and my day then begins with sorting through the correspondence, which arrives in considerable quantity." He said that he accompanied Benedict to morning audiences, followed by lunch together, a "short walk," and a rest, after which he presents him with documents which require his attention.

In January 2007, Italian artist and fashion designer Donatella Versace used Gänswein as the artistic inspiration for her Fall 2007 "Clergyman Collection", thereby boosting popular recognition of Gänswein's nickname, "Gorgeous George". In January 2013, Gänswein's photo, without his consent, appeared on the cover of the Italian version of Vanity Fair magazine.

In 2007 he was mentioned as a possible candidate for archbishop of Archdiocese of Munich and Freising in 2007. In August 2013 he said he did not see himself returning to Germany as an archbishop, that he was focused on Rome and he did not expect that to change.

In his private life, Gänswein plays tennis, skis, and flies airplanes.

Prefect of the Pontifical Household
On 7 December 2012, Gänswein was appointed Prefect of the Pontifical Household, replacing Cardinal James Michael Harvey, and raised to the rank of archbishop with the titular see of Urbs Salvia. In this position, until his duties were modified in February 2020, Gänswein arranged papal audiences both public and private, regardless of their size or rank of visitors, and handled the logistics for most large Vatican events and ceremonies as well as the pope's travels both in Rome and Italy. He was consecrated bishop on 6 January 2013 by Pope Benedict.

Resignation of Benedict XVI

Pope Benedict announced on 11 February 2013 that he was resigning on 28 February. Gänswein moved with him then to Castel Gandolfo while continuing in his role as head of the Pontifical Household. He moved with Benedict on 2 May to the Mater Ecclesiae Monastery in Vatican City.

Gänswein said he had known about the Pope's plan to resign for "quite some time beforehand" and had tried to change his mind, but "Pope Benedict had reached a decision. He was not to be shaken", he said. He said the news felt like "an amputation" and that "Accepting and coming to terms with my new role is painful". He resented that the press welcomed Pope Francis’ decision not to live in the papal apartments and said that  "Benedict didn’t live in the papal apartments for egotistical reasons – he was also very modest". After several months working for Francis he said "At the beginning of each day, I find myself once again waiting to see what will be different today". Then in the evening after 9 pm he handles Benedict's affairs and correspondence.

On the first anniversary of the resignation of Pope Benedict XVI, Gänswein said that "I am certain, indeed convinced, that history will offer a judgment that will be different than what one often read in the last years of his pontificate because the sources are clear and clarity springs from them." In 2016 he said that "Vatileaks" or other issues had "little or nothing" to do with Benedict's resignation. Gänswein said that Francis and Benedict are not two popes "in competition" with one another, but represent one "expanded" Petrine Office with an "active" member and a "contemplative" one. He said that Benedict had not abandoned the papacy like Pope Celestine V in the 13th century but rather sought to continue his in a more appropriate way given his frailty and that "Therefore, from 11 February 2013, the papal ministry is not the same as before. It is and remains the foundation of the Catholic Church; and yet it is a foundation that Benedict XVI has profoundly and lastingly transformed by his exceptional pontificate."

Relationship between Benedict and Francis
In January 2015 Gänswein denied a rumour that Pope Emeritus Benedict XVI had met the previous autumn with conservative cardinals concerned that the Synod of Bishops on the Family might allow civilly remarried Catholics access to the Eucharist. He called it "pure invention". He said Francis' renewed emphasis on pastoral care meant no change in doctrine and said: "The pope is the first guarantor and keeper of the doctrine of the Church and, at the same time, the first shepherd, the first pastor."

In July 2017, some commentators interpreted a statement by Benedict as criticism of Francis. Gänswein called them "stupid people" and said they engaged in "fantasy". He said that "The emeritus pope was deliberately exploited" and that "They want to exploit him. But all this will be useless."

In 2019, after Bishop Evaristo Spengler of Marajó, Brazil, told reporters that revisions Benedict made to canon law in 2009 could allow the ordination of women deacons, Gänswein said that assertion was "totally absurd and wrong". He said he had not spoken to Benedict about the matter and his comments "come only from me".

In his 2023 book, Nothing But The Truth - My Life Beside Benedict XVI, Gänswein says Benedict was "surprised" that Francis never responded to a 2016 public letter by four cardinals. He also says Benedict did not agree with some of Francis' positions. After Francis' interview with a Jesuit journal, Francis sent the journal to Benedict for his comments. Ganswein says Benedict, in his annotated response to Francis, critiqued the way Francis had responded to questions on abortion and homosexuality. He also writes that Benedict felt Francis' decision to restrict the use of the Latin Mass was "a mistake".

According to Die Zeit, Gänswein has been told to move out of the Mater Ecclesiae Monastery by 1 February 2023.

Dispute with Cardinal Sarah
In January 2020, Gänswein asked Cardinal Robert Sarah to have his publishers remove Pope Benedict's name as co-author with Sarah of a book about priestly celibacy, and to remove Benedict's name as author of the book's introduction and conclusions. He said Benedict had not participated in the writing nor authorized the use of his name. He characterized the problem as "a question of misunderstanding, without casting doubt on the good faith of Cardinal Sarah". Sarah had already denied that characterization of Benedict's role, but then asked his publishers to make changes in how Benedict's participation was represented, though his U.S. publisher refused to make any adjustment. 

Following his dispute with Sarah, Gänswein ceased to perform the public functions of his position as prefect of the papal household. He no longer appeared alongside Pope Francis at the pope's weekly audiences, nor greeted heads of state and the pope's other most important visitors. His title did not change. The Holy See Press Office said Gänswein's role reflected a "redistribution of the various commitments and duties" of papal household staff.

Views

Election of Pope Francis

In March 2014, he said he was shocked by the election of Pope Francis. Asked on ZDF on 13 March whether the election of Pope Francis at the conclave the previous year had surprised him, Archbishop Gänswein said, “Well, yes, as I had favoured other candidates – I was wrong – but then so were other people.” He went on to say that at the moment the Pope is the darling of the media “but that won’t always be the case”. The Pope is not “everybody’s darling”, he said.

2014 Extraordinary General Synod
Archbishop Gänswein said that marriage cannot be dissolved and that "starting a new union contradicts what the Lord has indicated". He made the remarks in an interview with Chi magazine, excerpts of which were released in advance on the fringes of a synod of bishops on the family that opened 6 October 2014 in the Vatican. Asked about the question of possibly allowing divorced and remarried people to receive communion, Gänswein said "this is a very delicate question, at stake is the sacramental matrimony that according to Catholic doctrine cannot be dissolved, just like the love of God for man" "As far as I can see Pope Francis is following the line of his predecessors whose teaching on matrimony is very clear".

Curial reform
Gänswein said: “I personally can see no significant reason which would necessitate a reform of the Curia at the moment. One or two changes have been made but that is part of the normal run of things. To speak of ‘Curial reform’ is, if I may say so, somewhat of an exaggeration.” Asked whether the Vatican and the church in general are polarised at the moment, he said "There is no polarisation as far as I can see and I haven’t experienced any. Certain measures here and there have been criticised and if the criticism is justified, that can surely benefit the general climate."

In 2017, asked about the dismissal of Cardinal Gerhard Müller from his post as prefect of the Congregation for the Doctrine of the Faith, Gänswein said: "I don't want to comment on a papal staff decision. But when I heard about it I was really most upset. He is, after all, a close personal friend."

Distinctions
 : Bavarian Order of Merit
 : Knight Commander of the Order of the Star of Romania
 : Grand Officer of the Order of Merit of the Italian Republic
 : Knight Grand cross in the Order of Merit of the Federal Republic of Germany
 : Decoration of Honour for Services to the Republic of Austria

Arms

Notes

References

Further reading

External links

Georg Gänswein at Catholic Hierarchy

1956 births
Living people
People from Waldshut (district)
21st-century Roman Catholic titular archbishops
German Roman Catholic titular bishops
Pope Benedict XVI
Officers Crosses of the Order of Merit of the Federal Republic of Germany
Prefects of the Papal Household
Grand Officers of the Order of Merit of the Italian Republic
Grand Officers of the Order of Christ (Portugal)
Recipients of the Grand Decoration for Services to the Republic of Austria
Clergy from Baden-Württemberg